Borovo, also known as Borovo Selo (to distinguish it from Borovo Naselje suburb which up until 1980 was also a part of the Borovo cadastral municipality), is a village and a municipality in Vukovar-Syrmia County in eastern Croatia. The settlement is situated on the Danube river on the state border with Serbia and the municipality of Bač on the other bank. The history of Borovo is closely intertwined with the river which as an recognized international waterway helped in development of Borovo as an important regional industrial center.

The village is named after the word for pines with the name Borovo meaning "of the pines".  While being a municipality in its own right, Borovo is closely related with neighboring Vukovar, to which it is physically connected and which absorbed aforementioned Borovo Naselje suburb. Borovo is by population the largest settlement in Croatia in which Serbs of Croatia constitute majority of residents and the settlement with the second largest Serb community in Vukovar-Syrmia in absolute numbers after Serbs of Vukovar.

Geography
The municipality is located on the Danube river, the second longest European river. The territory of the municipality is almost completely flat as it is located in Pannonian Plain, and it consist of fertile black soil adequate for the agricultural production of crops. Borovo is closely related with neighboring Vukovar, to which it is physically connected. It is connected by the D519 road to the rest of the country. Along its Danube bank municipality is bordering neighboring Republic of Serbia.

To the north it is bordered by the village of Dalj in Erdut municipality in Osijek-Baranja County, to the west the Trpinja municipality, to the south the town of Vukovar and its Borovo Naselje district and to the east the Danube river. About 30% of the entire territory of the municipality consists of residential area.

Per 2011 census, settlement itself was by population larger than some of the towns in Croatia with notable examples being Krapina, Pazin, Glina or Senj.

History

Borovo Municipality has been inhabited since the Stone Age. In the younger Iron Age this region was settled by the Celts. During Roman times area was a part of Danubian Limes. Several villages and the only crossing over the Danube in the entire empire existed in this area. The village of Borovo itself was mentioned for the first time in the year 1231 when it was a property of the town of Vukovar in the Kingdom of Hungary. At that time village was centered more to the north from its present-day location. Around 1540 Borovo was populated by Serbs who originated from the upper Drina and Polimlje. This migration caused linguistic change in the region since the local Ikavian pronunciation of the vowel Yat in Shtokavian dialect was changed with the Ekavian pronunciation. The Church of St Stephen the Archdeacon was built in the period between 1761 and 1764. At that time Borovo gained municipality status for the first time in its history. Municipality was administrated by local knez. In 1736 there was 49 houses in the entire village. Until 1811 this number increased to 231 of them. At that time Borovo had a population of 1754 inhabitants. In 1880 Borovo became the gain the municipality status for the second time and this municipality created a coat of arms in 1884 used by the modern day municipality as well.

Kingdom of Yugoslavia

Borovo became an important regional industrial center during the existence of Yugoslavia. In the period between the two world wars, Czech entrepreneur Jan Baťa's factory Bata Shoes opened one of their major factories in Borovo creating the economic growth after the crisis that followed the end of World War I. At that time, as the result of the development of business, modern day Borovo Naselje was built up. The village itself rise from 2213 inhabitants in 1932 to 4530 in 1936. In 1935 Borovo even included and airfield and Yugoslav airliner Aeroput connected the town with regular flights to Belgrade and Zagreb. In that time Borovo became municipality for the third time in its history.

Socialist Federal Republic of Yugoslavia
In 1945 Borovo footwear was nationalized. While being state owned factory managed entirely by its employees through the Yugoslav workers' self-management system. The company produced everything from shoe polish to shoeboxes and was selling its products across the former Yugoslavia through the 620 local Borovo shops. Company was producing around 23 million pairs of shoes a year in that period.

Croatian War of Independence
On 31 of March 1991 Serbian National Council of Slavonia, Baranja and Western Syrmia (body established on 7 of January 1991) organized a meeting in Borovo where it declared unification of the SAO Eastern Slavonia, Baranja and Western Syrmia with Vojvodina calling for an urgent extraordinary meeting of the Assembly of Vojvodina and National Assembly of Serbia to confirm the decision. Both assemblies received the request but never formally decided on it. The return of Goran Hadžić from the prison in Zagreb temporarily deescalated situation with most of road barricades being removed till the end of the first week of April. The escalation went further, however, when on April 8, 1991 the story was published about high-ranking Croatian officials shooting towards the village of Borovo. On the next day Josip Reihl-Kir tried to deescalate situation by stating that the firing with launch projectiles on Borovo was a response after the attack on Croatian Police without mentioning any Croatian officials. The interpretation of the event remained controversial and relevant in narratives about the beginning of the war in the region. On 1 of May 1991 elderly Serb resident of Bršadin was killed by his Hungarian neighbour with media reporting that the murderer was a member of HDZ leading to blockade of the D55 road despite victim's family calls against it. Serbian media reported that the victim worn Serbian tricolor and was murdered by a Croat while at the same night 2 Croatian policemen were taken hostages in Borovo in the event which will next day lead to the Battle of Borovo Selo leading to the direct involvement of the Yugoslav People's Army in the conflict in the region.

The Battle of Borovo Selo on 2 May 1991 was one of the first armed clashes in the conflict which became known as the Croatian War of Independence. The immediate cause for the confrontation was a failed attempt to replace a Yugoslav flag in the village with a Croatian one. The unauthorized effort by four Croatian policemen resulted in the capture of two by a Croatian Serb militia in the village. To retrieve the captives, Croatian authorities deployed additional police, who drove into an ambush. Twelve Croatian policemen and one Serb paramilitary were killed in the battle before the Yugoslav People's Army (JNA) units from Osijek intervened and stopped the fighting. On 4 of May river link across the Danube was established between Borovo and the village of Vajska in Vojvodina. It was reported that between 10-30,000 passengers from Borovo, Vera, Trpinja and Bobota used the river service while JNA used it to evacuate local Croats from Borovo to Vojvodina with four (including a minor 5 years old girl) among remaining Croats being killed by paramilitary units.

Croatian independence referendum was called on 19 May 1991 while Serb local authorities called for a boycott of the vote, which was largely followed by Croatian Serbs. On June 25, 1991, at the same day as the Socialist Republic of Croatia declared its withdrawal from Yugoslavia,  a self-proclaimed Serbian Autonomous Oblast SAO Eastern Slavonia, Baranja and Western Syrmia was established. In 1992, the oblast joined the breakaway Republic of Serbian Krajina. After the fall of Republic of Serbian Krajina rump Eastern Slavonia, Baranja and Western Syrmia remained as a short-lived Serb parallel entity. After the Erdut Agreement, the territory was reintegrated into Croatia within UN peacekeeping mission UNTAES. On 22 of May 1997 Borovo Municipality was established for a fourth time. It became one of the founding municipalities of the Joint Council of Municipalities.

Demographics

Population

According to 2011 Census Borovo had a population of 5,056 at the time. 89.73% of the population of municipality were ethnic Serbs (4,537 individuals). Second largest ethnic group were Croats (332) and there was also number of individuals who declared as follows: Ukrainians (8), Slovenians (2), Slovaks (23), Pannonian Rusyns (10), Russians (2), Romani (12), Poles (2), Germans (4), Macedonians (2), Hungarians (22), Czechs (3), Montenegrins (11), Bosniaks (14), Albanians (5) and others. About 100 individuals from younger generation left the village since the end of the war in search for a job in countries such as England, Norway, Australia and Canada. With pronounced issue of population decline in eastern Croatia caused by population ageing, effects of the Croatian War of Independence and emigration after the accession of Croatia to the European Union, the population of the municipality dropped to 3,555 residents at the time of 2021 census.

Languages

Serbian language

Serbian Language and Serbian Cyrillic alphabet is the second official language in the municipality of Borovo alongside the Croatian language which is official at the national level. Both Serbian and Croatian language are standardized varieties of the pluricentric Serbo-Croatian language.

According to the Municipal Statute, individuals who are members of the Serbian national minority are ensured the freedom of expression of national belonging and freedom to use their language and script in public and private use on the whole territory of the Municipality of Borovo. The statute guarantees that the Serbian Cyrillic alphabet will be used in the same font size as the Latin alphabet in the text of the local seals and stamps, on official plates of public representatives, executive and administrative bodies, as well as on those of legal persons with public authorities. Councillors or any other citizens have the right to get all of the working and official materials bilingually for any future and past sessions of the Municipal Assembly, and those materials must be in the same font size in both languages.

According to the municipal Statute, bilingual signs of the same font are used for written traffic signs and other written traffic markings, street and squares names and names of settlement and geographical localities on the entire territory of the Municipality. Equal public use of Serbian language is required on the basis of the Constitutional Act on the Rights of National Minorities in the Republic of Croatia and relevant national laws and the country is a party to the European Charter for Regional or Minority Languages.

Other languages
While only Croatian and Serbian enjoy official status, other languages were historically present and important in the region with some of them remaining in limited use up to the present day. With the development of industry in the interwar years the new Borovo Naselje suburb attracted newcomers from Czechoslovakia. Beginning in 1941 and during the World War II in Yugoslavia the Novo Borovo, a local factory weekly, published a section in German language called "Kamerad. Pressedienst der Deutschen Gefolgschaft der Borovoer Batawerke". As of 2020 German language is offered as an elective 4-8th grade course in the local elementary school. Church Slavonic language is occasionally used as a liturgical language in the local Eastern Orthodox church in Borovo.

Politics

Joint Council of Municipalities
The Municipality of Borovo is one of seven Serb majority member municipalities within the Joint Council of Municipalities, inter-municipal sui generis organization of ethnic Serb community in eastern Croatia established on the basis of Erdut Agreement. As Serb community constitute majority of the population of the municipality it is represented by 2 delegated Councillors at the Assembly of the Joint Council of Municipalities, double the number of Councilors to the number from Serb minority municipalities in Eastern Croatia.

Municipality government

The municipality assembly is composed of 15 representatives. Assembly filled in by members of the electoral lists that win more than 5% of votes. Dominant party in the municipality since the independence of Croatia and the reintegration of the region in 1998 is Independent Democratic Serb Party. 1,475, or 36.16%, out of 4,079 voters participated in 2017 Croatian local elections with 93.69% valid votes. With 93.42% and 1,378 votes, Zoran Baćanović from Independent Democratic Serb Party was elected as municipality major. Since a proportional number of ethnic Croats was not elected, one additional MP was appointed.

|- style="background-color:#E9E9E9" align=center
!colspan=2|Party
!Votes
!%
!Seats
|-
| bgcolor=#C50200|
|align=left valign=top|Independent Democratic Serb Party||1,094||79.16||13 
|-
| width=5px bgcolor=#38659C|
|align=left valign=top|Independent list||160 ||11.57||1
|-
| bgcolor=#013971|
|align=left valign=top|Serb People's Party&New Serb Party||128||9.26||1
|-
|align=left colspan=2|Additional representative of local Croat community||/||/||1
|-
|align=left colspan=2|Invalid/blank votes||93||6.31||—
|-
|align=left colspan=2|Total||1,475||100||—
|-
|align=left colspan=2|Registered voters/turnout||4,079||36.16||—
|-
|align=left colspan=8|

|-
|align=left colspan=8|Source
|}

Economy
Borovo is underdeveloped municipality which is statistically classified as the First Category Area of Special State Concern by the Government of Croatia. Croatian War of Independence and transformation from socialist economic system into capitalism lead to deindustrialization in the Borovo municipality. Huge part of the population reoriented themselves to the work in agriculture while the smaller section started small private businesses.

Education

Elementary education
Elementary School in Borovo was open in 1853. In 1936, the new building was officially opened under the name of State Folk School of Knight King Alexander First Unifier.

At the time of opening of new building the school in Borovo school was the largest one in Vukovar. After the World War II the school's name was changed once again, this time to Božidar Maslarić Elementary School. Following the Erdut Agreement, the school changed its name yet once again in 1997 and is known today simply as the Borovo Elementary School. In 2006, the school was thoroughly renovated from the European Union and Croatian government funds.

Culture

Points of Interest

Serbian Orthodox Church of St. Stephen in Borovo was completed in 1764. Church is listed in Register of Cultural Goods of Croatia. Iconostasis with 49 icons and other inventory is also specifically listed in Register.

Associations and Institutions
Borovo volunteer fire department is one of the oldest civil society organizations in the village. The fire department was established in 1932.

"Branislav Nušić" Cultural and Artistic Society, established in 1951 and reinitiated in 1996, has four sections: folklore, art, drama recitation and tamburitza with about 200 active members.

Contemporary Association of Antifascist Fighters of the People's Liberation War and Antifascists was established in 2000. With some 100 members in Borovo, association cooperates with the national umbrella Alliance of Anti-Fascist Fighters of Croatia. Prior to 1991 local World War II veterans were active in the Association of Fighters of the People's Liberation War of Yugoslavia.

Association of Serbs of Ozren and Posavina was established in 2009 bringing together post-World War II settlers who moved to the village from 1953 onwards. Association collaborate with partner organizations from Petrovo, Derventa, Bosanski Brod and other locations in Republika Srpska and the rest of Bosnia and Herzegovina.

Local pensioners association is a 320 members strong branch of the Zapadni Srem (Western Syrmia) Pensioners Association based in Vukovar. Plavi Dunav (Blue Danube) Association, established in 2007, is focused on preservation of nature, traditions, customs and development of local tourism while the Association of Beekeepers "Milena", established in 1998, brings together 40 members who collectively own approximately 450 beehives.

One of the three Serbian radio stations in the region, Radio Borovo, was formed in 1991 and was formally registered in accordance with Croatian laws following the end of war and the UNTAES mission in the region.

Sport
Fudbalski klub Sloga is a football club established in 1926. In that year, group of sailors from a Czech boat on Danube broth the first ball in the village and the first football match was played by sailors and a group of locals. The local club was established shortly after. In 1947 match with Špart from Beli Manastir took place on a day of annual local celebration and fair. In the summer of 1950 Sloga's guest was FK Partizan. Partizan won the match with the result 10-0. On a return match at the Partizan Stadium result was 3:1 for Partisan. Two years after Partizan, Red Star Belgrade was Sloga's guest as well. Sloga lost the match with the result 8:1. Jovica Sremac Punoš was a club's player that played in Serbian First League in 1939/1940 season, just before World War II. Nikola Perlić was one of the Sloga's players. In 2016 90th anniversary of the club was organized with FK Vojvodina coming as a guest team for a friendly match. General Consul of Serbia in Vukovar Nataša Kelezić, Milorad Pupovac, Mile Horvat, Vojislav Stanimirović and Dragan Crnogorac attended the match. Vojvodina won the match with the result 6:0. In 2016 club was competing in the Second County League of Vukovar-Srijem County and in Joint Council of Municipalities Veteran Football League.

Notable natives and residents
 Ratomir Dujković
 Nikola Perlić
 Vukašin Šoškoćanin

Twin municipalities – Sister municipalities
  Medina, Hungary
  Petrovo, Bosnia and Herzegovina
  Šamac, Bosnia and Herzegovina
  Žitište, Serbia
  Teslić, Bosnia and Herzegovina

Other forms of cooperation
  Negoslavci, Croatia
  Temerin, Serbia
  Titel, Serbia
  Žabalj, Serbia

See also
 Battle of Borovo Selo
 Serbs of Vukovar
 Radio Borovo
 Joint Council of Municipalities
 Borovo Naselje
 Vukovar-Syrmia County

References

Sources
 

Municipalities of Croatia
Populated places in Syrmia
Populated places in Vukovar-Syrmia County
Joint Council of Municipalities
Populated places on the Danube
Bata Corporation
Serb communities in Croatia